Father Armand David (7 September 1826, Espelette – 10 November 1900, Paris) was a Lazarist missionary Catholic priest as well as a zoologist and a botanist. 

Several species, such as Père David's deer, are named after him —  being French for Father David.

Biography

Born in Espelette near Bayonne, in the north of Basque Country, in Pyrénées-Atlantiques département of France, he entered the Congregation of the Mission in 1848, having already displayed great fondness for the natural sciences. Ordained in 1851, he was in 1862 sent to Peking, where he began a collection of material for a museum of natural history, mainly zoological, but in which botany, geology, and palaeontology were also well represented.

At the request of the French government, important specimens from his collection were sent to Paris and aroused the greatest interest. The Jardin des Plantes commissioned him to undertake scientific journeys through China to make further collections. He succeeded in obtaining many specimens of hitherto unknown animals and plants, and the value of his comprehensive collections for the advance of systematic zoology and especially for the advancement of animal geography received universal recognition from the scientific community at Paris in April, 1888. He had found in China all together 200 species of wild animals, of which 63 were hitherto unknown to zoologists, and 807 species of birds, 65 of which had not been described before. He made a large collection of reptiles, amphibians, and fishes and handed it over to specialists for further study.  Also, a large number of moths and insects, many of them hitherto unknown, were brought to the museum of the Jardin des Plantes. What Father David's scientific journeys meant for botany may be inferred from the fact that among the rhododendrons which he collected no less than fifty-two new species were found and among the primulae about forty, while the Western Mountains of China furnished an even greater number of hitherto unknown species of gentian.

The most notable of the animals 'found' by David, which were hitherto unknown to Europeans, were the giant panda in Baoxing County and Père David's deer. The latter had disappeared with the exception of a few preserved in the gardens of the emperor of China, but David succeeded in securing a specimen and sent it to Europe. David also sent back the first emerald ash borer specimen. In the midst of his work as a naturalist Father David did not neglect his missionary labours, and was noted for his careful devotion to his religious duties and for his obedience to every detail of his order's rules.

Eponymy
The plants Buddleja davidii and Ulmus davidiana, the David Elm, were named for him. The fish Sarcocheilichthys davidi was  named in his honor by Henri Émile Sauvage in 1878, because Père David collected the type specimen.

Père David's Rat Snake (Elaphe davidi) was named in his honor by Henri Émile Sauvage in 1884.

See also
Catholic Church in Sichuan
Catholic Church in China
Jesuit China missions
List of Roman Catholic scientist-clerics

Catholic missionaries in China
Michel Benoist
Giuseppe Castiglione
Armand David
Matteo Ricci
Johann Adam Schall von Bell
Ferdinand Verbiest
St. Francis Xavier

Eponymous taxa
Père David's tit
Père David's deer
Davidia involucrata
Père David's snowfinch
Père David's mole
Père David's owl
Père David's vole
Père David's rock squirrel
Père David's laughingthrush
Andrias davidianus
Clematis armandii
Buddleia davidii
Viburnum davidii
Acer davidii

References

External links
Père Jean Pierre Armand David CM, a biography by Bernard Scott

19th-century French botanists
Botanists active in China
19th-century French zoologists
1826 births
1900 deaths
Roman Catholic missionaries in Sichuan
Roman Catholic missionaries in China
Catholic clergy scientists
French-Basque people
French explorers
Vincentians
Zoological collectors
French expatriates in China
People from Labourd
19th-century French Roman Catholic priests
Missionary botanists